The 1930 World Table Tennis Championships men's doubles was the fourth edition of the men's doubles championship.
Miklós Szabados and Viktor Barna defeated Alfred Liebster and Robert Thum in the final by three sets to nil to retain their title.

Results

See also
List of World Table Tennis Championships medalists

References

-